Sutingphaa (1644–1648) was a king of the Ahom kingdom.  He was sickly and had scoliosis, and thus was also known as noriya roja and kekura roja.  He was often unable to attend to public duties and had to be carried in a palanquin.

Ascension
Sutingphaa became the king after his brother, the erstwhile king, was deposed.  He got in palace intrigues and was eventually deposed himself by his son Sutamla and killed.

Notes

References

 

1640s deaths
Ahom kings

Ahom kingdom

Year of birth unknown

Year of death uncertain